This is a list of neighborhoods in St. Petersburg in Pinellas County, Florida, United States. Many of the city's neighborhoods have been renamed, redefined and changed since the city's founding in 1888. As such, the exact extents of some neighborhoods can differ from person to person. The following is the list of all the city's major neighborhoods, including any corresponding sub-neighborhoods within them.

St. Petersburg, Florida, has more than 100 neighborhoods.

References

External links
 Broadwater
 Coquina Key
 Disston Heights
 North Kenwood

St. Petersburg